Hove is a seaside resort in East Sussex, England. It is one of the two main parts of the city of Brighton and Hove, along with Brighton.

Originally a "small but ancient fishing village" surrounded by open farmland, it grew rapidly in the 19th century in response to the development of its eastern neighbour Brighton; by the Victorian era it was a fully developed town with borough status. Neighbouring parishes such as Aldrington and Hangleton were annexed in the late 19th and early 20th centuries. The neighbouring  urban district of Portslade was merged with Hove in 1974. In 1997, as part of local government reform, the borough merged with Brighton to form the Borough of Brighton and Hove; this unitary authority was granted city status in 2000.

Name and etymology
Old spellings of Hove include Hou (Domesday Book, 1086), la Houue (1288), Huua (13th century), Houve (13th and 14th centuries), Huve (14th and 15th centuries), Hova (16th century) and Hoova (1675).  The etymology was disputed at length during the 20th century as academics offered several competing theories.  Suggestions included an Old Norse word meaning "hall", "sanctuary" or "barrow", in reference to the Bronze Age barrow near the present Palmeira Square; an Old English phrase æt þæm hofe meaning "at the hall"; the Old English hufe meaning "shelter" or "covering"; and the Middle English hofe meaning "anchorage".  No other places in Britain are called Hove, and single-syllable names as a whole are rare in Sussex.  The modern name was originally pronounced "Hoove".  The present pronunciation "is comparatively recent".

Geography and topography

Northern parts of Hove are built on chalk beds, part of the White Chalk Subgroup found across southeast England. There are also extensive areas of clay and sandy soil: areas of Woolwich Formation and Reading Formation clay, pockets of clay embedded with flint, and a large deposit of brickearth in the Aldrington area. Hove's beaches have the characteristics of a storm beach, and at high tide are entirely shingle, although low tide exposes sand between the sea-defence groynes, varying in extent from beach to beach. The water is then very shallow and suitable for paddling. On spring tides a greater expanse of sand is exposed beyond the end of the sea defences. There are no rivers in Hove, but Westbourne Gardens at the western boundary of the old parish is named after the "West Bourne", which was still visible in the 19th century but which now runs underground, and a map of 1588 shows another stream called East Brook.

Until the 19th century the  parish was mostly agricultural.  Three farms—Wick, Goldstone and Long Barn—dominated the area and owned most of the land, which was of good quality: agricultural writer Arthur Young described it as "uncommonly rich".  Crops including oats, barley, corn and various vegetables were grown.  Only in the 1870s were the last of the market gardens near Hove Street built over, and barley was grown near Eaton Road until the county cricket ground was built.  Water was provided by wells west of Hove Street and between the coast road and the sea (the latter was destroyed in the Great Storm of 1703).  The chalybeate spring on the Wick Farm estate was also used, especially by shepherds who drove their sheep between Hove, the South Downs and nearby villages along ancient drove roads.  Some local shepherds supplemented their income by catching larks and northern wheatears and selling them for their meat; the latter were popular among fashionable visitors to Brighton. The birds were common on the hills and valleys around Hove, such as Goldstone Bottom. The practice died out when wheatears became a protected species in the late 18th century.  The urban growth of Hove has shifted sheep-farming to more isolated parts of the South Downs, but several drove roads survive today as roads or footpaths. Hove Street and its northward continuation Sackville Road were originally known as Hove Drove and led on to the Downs.  A long west–east route which crossed West Blatchington, Hove and Preston parishes on its way to Lewes now bears the names The Droveway, The Drove and Preston Drove.  The section called The Droveway, on which the Goldstone Waterworks was built in the 1860s, had to be maintained as a right of way when Hove Park was built.  A long diagonal footpath once known as Dyer's Drove runs for several miles from Portslade-by-Sea on to the Downs, and Drove Road in Portslade village may have been used since Roman times.

A large Sarsen stone called the Goldstone stood on farmland northwest of the village, now part of Hove Park.  Links with druids were claimed; and some 19th-century sources stated it was part of a ring of stones similar to Stonehenge, and that the others were buried in a pond at Goldstone Bottom, one of the coombes (small dry valleys) between the Downs and the sea.  The Goldstone was dug up and buried by a farmer, but was unearthed and re-erected in a new position in the park in 1906.

Hove has little ancient woodland. Only two small areas survive: one in St Ann's Well Gardens, and The Three Cornered Copse in the Tongdean area. Trees in the copse include ash, beech, elm and sycamore, although more than 120 mature beech trees were blown down in the Great storm of 1987.

In common with other parts of the South Downs, much of land has been used as sheep pasture, but crop farming also takes place and large areas of land were claimed for military training during World War II. Toads Hole Valley, a  triangular site south of the Brighton Bypass, is "the last piece of unspoiled downland in Hove". It has been privately owned since 1937 and has been proposed for urban development for many years: in 2002 it was stated that "controversy rages over the future use of this land".

Acreage

Climate
Climate in this area has mild differences between highs and lows, and there is adequate rainfall year-round. The Köppen Climate Classification subtype for this climate is "Cfb" (Marine West Coast Climate/Oceanic climate).

History and development

Pre-Roman evidence 
Fossilised remains from the Pleistocene era have been found in three locations in Hove: an  molar from Elephas antiquus, excavated from the garden of a house in Poplar Avenue; teeth from a juvenile elephant deep in the soil at Ventnor Villas; and a prehistoric horse's tooth in the soil near Hove Street.

During building work near Palmeira Square in 1856–57, workmen uncovered a substantial burial mound. A prominent feature of the landscape since 1200 BC, the -high tumulus yielded, among other treasures, the Hove amber cup. Made of translucent red Baltic amber and approximately the same size as a regular china tea cup, the artefact can be seen in the Hove Museum and Art Gallery.  Only one other has been found in Britain.  Also buried in the coffin in which the amber cup was found were a stone battle-axe, a whetstone and a bronze dagger whose appearance is characteristic of the Wessex culture.

Domesday Book 
There are entries for Brighton and Portslade (Bristelmestune and Porteslage) and small downland settlements like Hangleton (Hangetone), but nothing for the location of Hove itself.

Middle Ages and Renaissance 
The first known settlement in Hove was around the 12th century when St Andrew's Church was established. Hove remained insignificant for centuries, consisting of just a single street running north–south some 250 m from the church, which by the 16th century was recorded as being in ruins.
Hangleton Manor is a well-preserved 16th-century flint manor building. It is believed to have been built c. 1540 for Richard Bel(l)ingham, twice High Sheriff of Sussex, whose initials are carved into a fireplace, and whose coat of arms adorns a period plaster ceiling. The Manor is currently serving as a pub-restaurant and whilst it was once on open downland, it is now surrounded by the 20th-century Hangleton housing estate.

18th century
In 1723 a traveller, the antiquary John Warburton, wrote, 'I passed through a ruinous village called Hove which the sea is daily eating up and is in a fair way of being quite deserted; but the church being quite large and a good distance from the shore may perhaps escape'. Nevertheless, in around 1702 The Ship Inn had been built at the seaward end of the main street, and was therefore vulnerable to erosion of the coast.

In 1724, Daniel Defoe wrote in reference to the south coast, 'I do not find they have any foreign commerce, except it be what we call smuggling and roguing; which I may say, is the reigning commerce of all this part of the English coast, from the mouth of the Thames to the Land's End in Cornwall."

The fertile coastal plain west of the Brighton boundary had significant deposits of brickearth and by c.1770 a brickfield had been established on the site of what would become Brunswick Square. Later, other brickfields were established further west, remaining until displaced by housing development.

Regency and Victorian developments 
The census of 1801 recorded only 101 residents to Brighton's 7,339. By 1821, the year the Prince Regent was crowned George IV, the population had risen to 312, Brighton's too had trebled to 24,429  with the dwellings still clustered on Hove Street, surrounded by an otherwise empty landscape of open farmland. This relative isolated location of Hove, compared to Brighton, was ideal for smuggling and there was considerable illicit activity. Hove smugglers became notorious, with contraband often being stored in the now partially repaired St. Andrew's Church. Tradition has it that The Ship Inn was a favourite rendezvous for the smugglers, and in 1794 soldiers were billeted there. In 1818 there was a pitched battle on Hove beach between revenue men and smugglers, from which the latter emerged as the victors. As part of the concerted drive by Parliament to combat smuggling, a coastguard station was opened at the southern end of Hove Street in 1831, next to The Ship Inn.

Also at the bottom of Hove Street was the bull-ring. At a bull-bait in 1810 the bull escaped, scattering spectators before being recaptured and dragged back to the ring. This was the last bull-bait to take place in Hove.

In the years following the Coronation of 1821 the Brunswick estate of large Regency houses with a theatre, riding schools and their own police was developed on the seafront near the boundary with Brighton. Although within Hove parish the residents of these elegant houses avoided the name of the impoverished village a mile to the west as an address. Straggling development along the coast loosely connected the estate to fashionable Brighton, so that name was used instead.

Dating from 1822, the Brighton to Shoreham turnpike crossed the north of Hove parish along the route of the present Old Shoreham Road.

The Brighton General Gas Light Company was formed in 1825. Production of coal gas was notorious for the foul smell it produced, and was only sited in the poorest areas. The company acquired land in the fields between Hove Street and the ruins of St. Andrew's Church, and in 1832 built a gasworks on a two-acre site. The process required substantial tonnage of coal, delivered by horse-drawn cart on the unmade tracks in the vicinity, and removal of by-products including coke, coal tar, sulphur and ammonia by the same means. With a tall chimney and two gasometers next to the churchyard, this industrial site was a considerable intrusion on the impoverished populace of Hove, although not for rapidly growing but still-distant Brighton, which was the main centre of consumption. Being situated in Hove avoided the duty of £1 per 8 tons levied on coal by the Brighton Town Act of 1773. A gasworks built east of Brighton in 1819, and therefore similarly exempt, was supplied by sailing brigs grounding at high tide, the crew tipping the coal down chutes into horse-drawn carts then re-floating on the next tide. This method, risky for the vessel and also inherently dirty and disruptive, may have been used at Hove until eventually superseded. The railway arrived in 1840 whilst several miles along the coast Shoreham Harbour was increasing its coal trade. By 1861 the site had doubled in size and there were now five gasometers, ranging in size from small to large. Due to spiralling demand, in 1871 a large new works was built at Portslade-by-Sea in Shoreham Harbour, and by 1885 all gas manufacture in Brighton and Hove had been transferred there. The Hove site, in a by now primarily residential area, was then used for storage only.

By 1831 the development of the eastern end of the parish had increased the population to 1,360  but this brought few economic benefits to Hove village itself, with the historian Thomas Horsfield describing it in 1835 as 'a mean and insignificant assemblage of huts'.

St Andrew's Church was reconstructed and enlarged to its present form in 1836, to the design of the architect George Basevi (1794–1845), and features prominently in the background of paintings of the period. About this time, a very substantial and tall wall was built between the churchyard and adjoining gasworks, remaining in place to this day.

The flat coastal plain was useful for sport as from 1848 to 1871 England's oldest county club, Sussex County Cricket Club, used the Royal Brunswick Ground in Hove, situated roughly on the site of present-day Third and Fourth Avenues. In 1872 the club moved to the present County Cricket Ground, Hove.

Two further large estates were developed between Hove village and Brunswick, and both avoided using the name Hove: Cliftonville was designed, laid out and initially developed under Frederick Banister from the late 1840s; and West Brighton Estate in the 1870s.

West of Brunswick, the seafront of West Brighton Estate forms the end of a series of avenues, in numerical order beginning with First Avenue, mostly composed of fine Victorian villas built as another well-integrated housing scheme featuring mews for artisans and service buildings. Grand Avenue, The Drive, and the numbered avenues were developed through the 1870s and 1880s, with many of the buildings constructed by William Willett.

Hove's wide boulevards contrast with the bustle of Brighton, although many of the grand Regency and Victorian mansions have been converted into flats. Marlborough Court was once the residence of the Duchess of Marlborough, aunt of Winston Churchill. The Irish nationalist leader and Home Rule MP Charles Stewart Parnell used to visit his lover, the already married Kitty O'Shea at the house she rented in 1883 in Medina Villas, Hove. In the subsequent divorce action the cook alleged that Captain O’Shea returned home unexpectedly and Parnell beat a hasty retreat by climbing over the balcony and down a rope ladder. Parnell died at Hove in 1891 after marrying Kitty following her divorce.

The Hove Club, a private members' club located at 28 Fourth Avenue, was founded in 1882.

First World War

Over 600 men from Hove were killed in the First World War. After the armistice, the town established a war memorial committee to decide on commemoration of the dead. The committee commissioned Sir Edwin Lutyens, the architect responsible for the Cenotaph on London's Whitehall which became the focus of national remembrance services. Lutyens proposed a similar cenotaph for Hove and went as far as constructing a wooden mock-up which was displayed on Hove Lawns but the committee rejected the design. The eventual result was a statue of Saint George atop a column, situated in the centre of Grand Avenue. The memorial does not contain the names of the fallen, which are instead recorded on a bronze plaque in Hove Library.

Second World War
At the outbreak of war, the recently completed Hove Marina leisure centre was immediately requisitioned as a training base for new officers of the Royal Navy Volunteer Reserve (RNVR) and was given the title . The establishment opened on 11 September 1939 and later expanded into Lancing College. By the end of the war, the base had trained 22,508 British, Commonwealth and allied officers for active sea service.

On 22 September 1939, the second Anglo-French Supreme War Council was held at Hove Town Hall to discuss the progress of the war and define future strategy. The British delegation included the Prime Minister, Neville Chamberlain and the Foreign Secretary, Lord Halifax, while the French party was led by the Minister of Defence and Prime Minister of France, Édouard Daladier and Commander-in-Chief of the Armies, Maurice Gamelin. Also present was Sir Alexander Cadogan who related that the town hall staff had only been told to expect some government officials, with the result that the prime minister was greeted with the exclamation; "Chamberlain! Cor Blimey!".

The Brighton and Hove area was subjected to heavy bombing by the Luftwaffe between 1940 and 1944, known collectively as the "Brighton Blitz", which resulted in the deaths of 198 civilians.

Governance and politics

Former Hove borough

The ancient parish of Hove originally consisted of only  and in 1801 had a population of just 101. In 1829, local landowners petitioned parliament for powers to improve the Brunswick Town area of Hove with paving, lighting and drainage, resulting in the appointment of a body known as the Brunswick Commissioners in the following year. Subsequently, further commissioners were appointed for West Hove and to administer the Hove Police, all three bodies being united by the Hove Commissioners Act of 1873. In 1893 the civil parish of Aldrington was joined to Hove and in 1894, the Hove Commissioners were replaced by an Urban District Council. Finally in 1898 the Municipal Borough of Hove received its royal charter. This was enlarged in 1927 by the addition of the parishes of Preston Rural and Hangleton along with parts of West Blatchington and Patcham. The corporation consisted of a mayor, ten aldermen, and thirty councillors, elected from ten wards. The first town hall was built in 1882. On 1 April 1997 Brighton Borough Council and Hove Borough Council were merged to form Brighton and Hove City Council.

Coat of arms
While it was still a separate entity, Hove had its own coat of arms.  The escutcheon's official heraldic description is "Tierced in pairle: 1. Or a saltire azure voided argent; 2. Gules two pairs of leg-irons interlaced argent; 3. Checky or and azure three martlets or, all in a border ermine charged with six martlets or".  The design incorporates several features relevant to Hove's history.  The ships of the French raiders who repeatedly attacked the coast in the Brighton and Hove area in the 16th century are represented by the crest.  The saltire of Saint Andrew and the leg-shackles of Leonard of Noblac refer to the ancient parish churches of Hove and Aldrington, St Andrew's and St Leonard's respectively.  William de Warenne, 1st Earl of Surrey held land in the Rape of Lewes at the time of the Norman Conquest including the territory covered by Hove; his colours were blue and gold, represented by the chequerboard pattern in the background of the shield.

Commercial 
The town centre received substantial renovation in the late 1990s when the popular George Street was pedestrianised. Some concern about the pedestrianisation and its impact (supposedly killing trade) was expressed by residents, the local newspaper The Argus, and small locally owned shops. However these fears proved unfounded. In 2003 these small shops were joined by the centre's first large supermarket (a Tesco), built on the site of a former gasometer.

Landmarks and attractions

Places of worship
 

Ecclesiastically, Hove was part of a joint parish with Preston between 1531 and 1879.  The newly separate parish of Hove was then split several times in the late 19th and 20th centuries as the population grew and more Anglican churches were built.  St Andrew's Church near the top end of Hove Street was the ancient parish church but was in ruins by the 1830s, when it was rebuilt in a Neo-gothic style.  St Helen's Church at Hangleton, lightly restored in the 1870s, retains the style of a simple Sussex downland church.  St Peter's Church was abandoned and fell to ruins in the 17th century when West Blatchington became depopulated, but it was rebuilt in the 1890s. St Leonard's, the parish church of Aldrington, was also ruinous until 1878 when local population growth necessitated its restoration.

A second church dedicated to St Andrew opened on the Brunswick estate in 1828.  St John the Baptist's was built on Palmeira Square in 1852, followed by St Patrick's nearby in 1858 and Holy Trinity in central Hove in 1864.  St Barnabas served the poorer areas around Sackville Road from 1883; All Saints on Eaton Road dates from 1889 to 1891; St Philip's was built in 1895 as a second church for Aldrington, and opened a mission hall (now Holy Cross Church) in the Poets' Corner area in 1903; St Thomas the Apostle opened on Davigdor Road in 1909; St Agnes was built north of Hove station in 1913; Bishop Hannington Memorial Church opened in West Blatchington in 1939; and The Knoll estate has been served by St Richard's Church since 1961, replacing an 1930s church hall.  Four of these churches have closed: St Agnes in 1977, St Andrew's in Brunswick Town in 1990, St Thomas in 1993 and Holy Trinity in 2007.  All Saints Church, a Grade I-listed building by John Loughborough Pearson, became the parish church of Hove in 1892.

The Church of the Sacred Heart was Hove's first Roman Catholic church.  It was founded in 1876 by St Mary Magdalen's Church in Brighton, whose first priest left money in his will for a church in Hove.  Work was delayed by disputes over the site, but after land on Norton Road was secured construction started in 1880 and the west end was finished in 1887.  The Sacred Heart in turn founded a mission church in 1902 to serve the Aldrington and Portland Road areas of Hove.  St Peter's Hall was used until the "startling" basilica-style red-brick St Peter's Church was opened in 1915.  Mass was said in Hangleton from the 1940s in a hall and at the Grenadier pub, but in the 1950s land on Court Farm Road was bought for a church and St George's Church opened in 1968.  It serves West Blatchington and Hangleton, and is now part of a joint parish with Southwick and Portslade.

Hove was included in the Lewes and Brighton Methodist Circuit from 1808, although at times during the 19th century no Methodists (Wesleyan, Primitive or Bible Christian) lived in the area.  A secondhand tin tabernacle was erected on Portland Road for Wesleyans in 1883, and the present Hove Methodist Church was built on the site in 1896.  A Bible Christian chapel was built in 1905 on Old Shoreham Road but never thrived; it closed in 1947 and was sold to a charity.  Primitive Methodists worshipped at a large chapel on Goldstone Villas from 1878 until 1933.  It was converted into offices in 1968.

Hove's General Baptist congregation developed in the 1870s and met in a gymnasium and a tin tabernacle until Holland Road Baptist Church opened in 1887.  A deacon from the church started holding Baptist meetings in a new church building on the Hangleton estate in 1957.  It now has the name Oasis Church.  A former Congregational mission hall in Aldrington, built in 1900, is home to the Baptist-aligned New Life Christian Church.  Stoneham Road Baptist Church was founded in 1904 by the Holland Road church to serve the Poets' Corner area.  It closed and was demolished in 2008.  Baptists also met in Connaught Terrace from 1879, and Strict Baptists worshipped at Providence Chapel on Haddington Street from 1880 until 1908.

A Congregational chapel was built on Ventnor Villas in 1870, and 41 years later St Cuthbert's Presbyterian Church opened on Holland Road.  After the two denominations merged in 1972 to form the United Reformed Church, the congregations came together in 1980 at the Ventnor Villas premises.  These were renamed Central United Reformed Church and continue to serve as the main centre for that denomination in Hove.  St Cuthbert's was demolished in 1984.  In 1938 trustees of the Congregational chapel founded another on the Hangleton estate.  Hounsom Memorial Church is also now part of the United Reformed Church.

The Salvation Army have worshipped in Hove since 1882 and occupy a citadel built in 1890 on Sackville Road.  Jehovah's Witnesses meet in Aldrington at a Kingdom Hall which was built in 1999 to replace a hall of 1950.  A non-denominational gospel hall stands on Edward Avenue in the Goldstone Valley area.  The Christian Arabic Evangelical Church meets in a converted bungalow on Old Shoreham Road in Aldrington.  A former Anglican church of 1909 on Davigdor Road has served Coptic Orthodox Christians from a wide area since 1994, when it was rededicated as St Mary and St Abraam Church by Pope Shenouda III of Alexandria.  Buddhists have a cultural centre and place of worship at a former convent near Furze Hill.  Other former churches in Hove include an Elim Pentecostal chapel (in use 1929–1994) on Portland Road, the Seventh-day Adventist chapel on Hove Place, whose congregation now meet at Hove Methodist Church, and a former mission hall in the Poets' Corner area which was used until  1981 as a chapel for the local Society of Dependants sect.

Hove Museum and Art Gallery 
Hove Museum and Art Gallery houses a permanent collection of toys, contemporary crafts, fine art and local history artefacts, as well as holding temporary exhibitions of contemporary crafts.

Education 
Hove's primary schools are: West Blatchington Primary and Nursery School, St. Andrew's CE School, Hove Junior School, Benfield Junior School, Goldstone Primary School, Hangleton Junior School, Cottesmore St Mary's Catholic School, Mile Oak Primary School, Bilingual Primary School, Brunswick Primary School and Aldrington CE School. There are four secondary schools serving the area: Blatchington Mill School, Cardinal Newman Catholic School, Hove Park School and King's School.

Brighton Hove & Sussex Sixth Form College (BHASVIC), formerly Brighton, Hove & Sussex Grammar School, is a dedicated place of further education, along with the Connaught Centre, Hove Park Sixth Form Centre and Blatchington Mill Sixth Form College.

Brighton is also the location of private colleges such as Hove College. Founded in 1977, Hove College is a non-profit private higher education institution and offers courses accredited by OCN London.

Hove has a number of private schools including Deepdene School, Lancing College Preparatory School (formerly Mowden School) The Montessori Place, The Drive Prep School and St Christopher's School (now part of Brighton College). There are also language schools for foreign students.

Sport and leisure 
The home of Sussex County Cricket Club is at County Cricket Ground, Hove. It is used for county, national and international matches, music concerts, fireworks displays, and has found resurgent popularity with the introduction of Twenty20.

Until 1997 Hove was home to the Brighton & Hove Albion F.C.'s Goldstone Ground. In September 2007, planning permission was confirmed for the club's new ground, at Falmer, still within the city limits but on the Brighton side. The new stadium started development in late 2008, with the first game being played in August 2011.

Brighton & Hove Hockey Club is a field hockey club and its home ground is based in Hove.

There are a number of parks in Hove including Hove Park and St. Anne's Well Gardens. The King Alfred Centre which is currently a leisure centre with swimming pool and a couple of gyms on the seafront. In March 2007 Brighton and Hove City Council gave planning permission for a £290 million pound development designed by Frank Gehry. This project was scrapped in January 2009 when the developer pulled out.

Hove Promenade parkrun, situated by Hove Lawns started in July 2015 and is one of five such free, timed 5 km runs across the city.

The Monarch's Way long-distance footpath threads south-eastwards across the town from the Downs, before heading west along the seafront towards its terminus at Shoreham-by-Sea.

"Hove, Actually"

A well-known reply by residents of Hove, usually humorous, when asked if they live in Brighton is "Hove, actually" thus maintaining a distinction with their less genteel neighbour. One source has identified the locally resident actor Laurence Olivier (who lived in Brighton) as the origin of the phrase. In the 1990s the Hove borough council used the slogan "Hove, actually" to promote the town for tourism.

Transport 

Hove has a comprehensive public transport system including buses to all districts, a bus monitoring system accessible via the internet and with displays at some bus stops (a system integrated with Brighton), and taxis which are able to pick up across the city of Brighton and Hove.

Hove has three railway stations. Hove railway station has direct access to the Brighton Main Line to London via a loop eliminating the need to go through Brighton. Hove is on the West Coastway Line, as are Aldrington and Portslade and West Hove stations. A 'halt' stop at Holland Road, between Hove and Brighton, was in operation from 1905 to 1956. Direct train journeys to London take just over an hour, and to Brighton, a few minutes.

Branching off close to Aldrington was formerly a branch line to Devil's Dyke which closed in 1938. The route of the line may be followed along a path alongside West Hove golf club; the path leads all the way to Devil's Dyke, and railway sleepers once used under the tracks may be seen to either side of the path, plus the remains of two of the stations still exist in places but are on private land.

Notable residents

Luigi Arditi (1822-1903), Italian composer.
Jonathan Bailey (born 1988), actor
Charles Busby (1786-1834), architect.
Rear Admiral Sir John Hindmarsh (1785-1860), naval officer and first Governor of South Australia.
Sir Jack Hobbs (1882-1963), cricketer.
Ann James (1925 – 2011), English-born Canadian artist and educator.
Mary-Belle Kirschner (Belle Delphine) (born 1999), Internet celebrity and model.
Charley Mitchell (1861-1918), boxer.
Margaret Powell, writer (1907–1984), born in Hove; there is a bus named after her and a blue plaque on her house.
Charles Stewart Parnell (1846-1891), Irish Nationalist politician.
Anthony Trafford, Baron Trafford (1932-1989), physician and Conservative politician.

See also 
Grade I listed buildings in Brighton and Hove
List of conservation areas in Brighton and Hove
List of landmarks and notable buildings of Brighton and Hove
List of people from Brighton and Hove
List of places of worship in Brighton and Hove
Hove Borough Council elections for the political history of the former borough council which governed the town from 1974 to 1997.

Notes

References

Bibliography

 Glynn, Mark (2019) ‘Hove: The fall and rise and rise and fall.’

External links 

 Brighton & Hove – delivering 24hr city council services, official website
 Official City Transport site with live bus times, car parks, and further information
 Map Of Brighton & Hove Interactive map of Brighton & Hove, with locations of businesses and other points of interest
 Brighton and Hove News
 Brighton history

 
Towns in East Sussex
Populated coastal places in East Sussex
Former non-metropolitan districts of East Sussex
Beaches of East Sussex
Unparished areas in East Sussex
Former boroughs in England
Brighton and Hove
Former civil parishes in East Sussex